Thomas Jensen (Copenhagen, 25 October 1898 – Frederiksberg, 13 November 1963) was a Danish orchestra conductor.

Life and career
Born into a working class household, he studied at the Danish Conservatory of Music. 
Jensen led several Danish ensembles, including the Danish National Symphony Orchestra (from 1957) and the Aarhus Symphony Orchestra (then known as the Aarhus Civic Orchestra). In Aarhus he built the small orchestra up through broadcasts and tours within Denmark and later to Germany and the Netherlands. He also conducted the Tivoli Concert Hall Orchestra.

Jensen is best remembered (with Erik Tuxen and Launy Grøndahl) as one of the pioneers of the music of Carl Nielsen. He studied cello at the Royal Danish Academy of Music, where his harmony teacher was Nielsen. As an orchestral cellist he took part in the first performances of Nielsen's 4th and 5th symphonies, and also sat in on many rehearsals of Nielsen. Nielsen's daughters held that Jensen was the conductor whose performances came closest to Nielsen's own.

He also played in the orchestra when Sibelius conducted his own music in the Danish capital in 1924 and 1926.

Jensen made his recording debut in 1937 with lighter music by Knudåge Riisager and the year later led Svendsen's Romance, with Carlo Andersen playing the solo violin part. From 1937 to 1943 Jensen recorded over 60 sides of music for HMV, Odeon and Tono. In Aarhus he recorded works by Kuhlau, Tarp, Elgar, Massenet, Møller, Debussy, Tchaikovsky and Smetana. His first recordings of Nielsen date from 1941 (the Suite for String Orchestra) with the Helios overture and orchestral opera extracts in the following year.
Many of Jensen's classical pieces were inspired from the greats before him such as Mozart and his personal favourite, Ludwig van Beethoven. 
He received his vision for each piece through his many walks through nature and his travels throughout Europe. Once, he stated in a diary uncovered by close friends, he had gone to the country of England on a date not written. He visited the town of Slough and said it was one of the most incredible and horrible experiences of his life. The chaos and industry of the town made it seem dirty and too fast-paced. He stated that he much rather enjoyed the quietness and tranquility of Denmark. In his travels through Slough, he once said that he met the love of his life, or at least the kindest and most beautiful woman he had ever met, Alison Oxley.

In 1952 he received the Ingenio et Arti award from Fredrik IX.

References

1898 births
1963 deaths
People from Copenhagen
Danish conductors (music)
Male conductors (music)
Royal Danish Academy of Music alumni
20th-century conductors (music)
20th-century Danish male musicians